Allendale, Michigan may refer to:

Allendale Charter Township, Michigan, a town
Allendale, Michigan, a census-designated place within the town